Krákumál or the Lay of Kraka is a skaldic poem, consisting of a monologue in which Ragnar Lodbrok is dying in Ælla's snake pit and looks back at a life full of heroic deeds. It was composed in the 12th century, almost certainly in the Scottish islands. It is composed in a kind of háttlausa in 29 stanzas, most of them with ten lines. Thomas Percy was the first to translate the poem into English. 

In moving and forceful language, the poem deals with the joys of the life of a warrior, the hope that his death will be followed by a gory revenge, and the knowledge that he will soon know the pleasures of Valhalla.

The poem has been translated into several languages and it has contributed to the modern image of a Viking warrior.

Sample
The following is the text of the first stanza with a literal translation:

In popular culture

 In History Channel's drama series Vikings ("All His Angels"), the poem forms the basis for the final words of Ragnar Lothbrok, played by Travis Fimmel. Stanza 23 is read in old norse in the episode "The Best Laid Plans".
 French Nordic neofolk group SKÁLD performed extracts of the poem in their song Krákumál, featured in their 2019 album Vikings Chant.

Notes

References
 
 Ó Corráin, Donnchadh (Mar 1979) "High-Kings, Vikings and Other Kings". Irish Historical Studies 22 No. 83 pp. 283–323. Irish Historical Studies Publications.

External links
Krákumál in Old Norse from «Kulturformidlingen norrøne tekster og kvad» Norway
Nordisk familjebok on Krákumál
Haukur Þorgeirsson on the poem with a recording
Krákumál Old Norse
Another page by Haukur Þorgeirsson with a glossary
Northvegr's edition
Two editions back to back

Cultural depictions of Ragnar Lodbrok
Skaldic poems
Völsung cycle